Norbert Gombos was the defending champion but lost in the first round to Jerzy Janowicz.

Lukáš Lacko won the title after defeating Marius Copil 6–4, 7–6(7–4) in the final.

Seeds

Draw

Finals

Top half

Bottom half

References
Main Draw
Qualifying Draw

Slovak Open - Singles
2017 Singles